Patepur Assembly constituency is an assembly constituency in Vaishali district in the Indian state of Bihar.It is reserved for scheduled castes.

Overview

As per Delimitation of Parliamentary and Assembly constituencies Order, 2008, No. 130 Patepur Assembly constituency is composed of the following: Patepur community development block; Mansinghpur Bijhrauli, Kumar Bajitpur, Raghopur Narsanda, Adalpur, Naree Khurd and Laxmipur Barbatta gram panchayats of Jandaha community development block.

Patepur Assembly constituency (SC) is part of No. 22 Ujiarpur (Lok Sabha constituency).

Members of Legislative Assembly

Election results

2020

1977-2010
In the 2010 state assembly elections, Mahendra Baitha of BJP won the Patepur assembly seat defeating his nearest rival Prema Chaudhary of RJD. Contests in most years were multi cornered but only winners and runners up are being mentioned. Prema Chaudhary of RJD defeated Mahendra Baitha of LJP in October 2005. Mahendra Baitha of LJP defeated Prema Chaudhary of RJD in February 2005. Prema Chaudhary of RJD defeated Mahendra Baitha of JD(U) in 2000. Mahendra Baitha of JD defeated Prema Chaudhary of SAP in 1995. Ram Sundar Das of JD defeated Baleshwar Singh Paswan of Congress in 1990. Baleshwar Singh Paswan of Congress defeated Paltan Ram of LD in 1985. Shiv Nandan Paswan of Janata Party (Secular – Charan Singh) defeated Baleshwar Singh Paswan of Congress in 1980. Paltan Ram of JP defeated Rijahan Ram of CPI in 1977.

2015 and 2020
In 2015; Prema Chaudhary of Rashtriya Janata Dal defeated Mahendra Baitha of Bhartiya Janata Party by 12,461 votes. In 2020 assembly elections the contest to Patepur assembly seats was bilateral. In a tough fight, Lakhendra Kumar Raushan (aka Lakhendra Paswan) of Bhartiya Janata Party defeated Shivchandra Ram of Rashtriya Janata Dal.

References

External links
 

Assembly constituencies of Bihar
Politics of Vaishali district